Blubberella is a 2011 German exploitation comedy film written and directed by Uwe Boll. 
The plot is about an obese dhampir superhero, set in German-occupied Europe. The entire film is a scene-for-scene spoof of BloodRayne: The Third Reich (directed by Boll himself the previous year) with most of the same cast and crew. The film received negative reviews.

Plot

In the year 1940, Blubberella is an obese vampire/human hybrid with a hatred of Adolf Hitler, and a soft spot for food. The rest of the film roughly follows the plot of Bloodrayne 3: The Third Reich, although some scenes are inserted for comedic purposes, such as a scene were Blubberella talks to her mum, and numerous jokes about sex, obesity and being gay.

Cast

Reception

The film received negative reviews.

In an interview with Popzara's Brittany Vincent, Hollister said she took the role because of diminishing opportunity for large actresses to find work in Hollywood. "I've been doing this for ten years. While I've been extremely lucky to play some amazing characters, I’ve watched the roles dry up. And I’ve been shut out of even auditioning for many character roles because I'm too large."  On taking on the title role of Blubberella, she states "This movie would have been done with or without me. It would have been a lot more offensive if I hadn’t done it. But I didn’t win the war about the title. I hate the title." In an interview with Entertainment Weekly Hollister discussed the film and insisted her decision to take the role wasn’t based on money alone: "I'm not ashamed of Blubberella... Of course there's fat jokes in the film. If they had put another salami sandwich in my hand, I was going to start killing the crew. But I want people to know we weren't setting out to hate fat people. It's important for me that people know the true story." She went on to say, "This movie was made with the best intentions. I truly wanted to make a movie about a fat girl who could kick ass."

References

External links
 
 
 
 
 Blubberella review

2011 films
2011 action comedy films
2011 comedy horror films
2010s adventure comedy films
2011 independent films
Eastern Front of World War II films
English-language German films
Fictional half-vampires
Films about Adolf Hitler
Films about Nazi Germany
Films directed by Uwe Boll
Films set in 1940
Films set in Europe
Films shot in Croatia
German action comedy films
Remakes of German films
German independent films
2010s parody films
Supernatural thriller films
Vampire comedy films
War adventure films
Female characters in film
Fictional vampire hunters
2010s supernatural horror films
Nazi zombie films
German parody films
2010s English-language films
2010s German films